Max Kröckel (1901–1986) was a German skier. He was born in Neuhaus am Rennweg. He competed at the 1928 Winter Olympics in St. Moritz, where he placed 14th in Nordic combined.

References

External links
 

1901 births
1986 deaths
German male Nordic combined skiers
Olympic Nordic combined skiers of Germany
Nordic combined skiers at the 1928 Winter Olympics